Teutoniomyia is a genus of flies in the family Sciomyzidae, the marsh flies or snail-killing flies.

Species
Species include:
Teutoniomyia plaumanni Hennig, 1952
Teutoniomyia costaricensis Steyskal, 1960

References

Sciomyzidae
Sciomyzoidea genera